Goossen is a Dutch surname, meaning "son of Goos/Goossen" ("Goswin"). Notable people with this name include:

Duane Goossen, American politician
Eugene Goossen (1921–1997), American art critic and art historian
Greg Goossen (1945–2011), American baseball player
Hugo Goossen (born 1960s), Surinamese swimmer
Jan Goossen (1937–2005), Dutch sculptor
Jeananne Goossen (born 1985), Canadian actress
Matthias Goossen (born 1992), Canadian football player
Nicholaus Goossen (born 1978), American director and photographer
Pol Goossen (orn 1949), Flemish film and television actor
Steve Goossen (born 1968), Dutch footballer
As a given name
Goossen van der Weyden (ca. 1465– aft. 1538), Flemish painter

See also
Goosen
Goossens

References

Dutch-language surnames
Patronymic surnames
Russian Mennonite surnames